Prague is a 2006 Danish film written and directed by Ole Christian Madsen, starring Mads Mikkelsen, Stine Stengade and Jana Plodková.

Plot
Married couple Christoffer and Maja have travelled to Prague to collect and bring home the body of Christoffer's father for burial in Denmark. When they have checked into their hotel, Christoffer visits the hospital mortuary. Having been estranged from his father since childhood, he views the corpse dispassionately and leaves with a cardboard box containing pyjamas and other possessions including a mobile phone.
To Cristoffer's surprise, the phone rings and he finds himself speaking to a lawyer who is handling the estate—and who later turns out to be the father's gay lover. Returning to his hotel room, he confronts Maja with his knowledge of a clandestine affair she has been engaged in. She confesses to this but has not lost her love for her husband who, she claims, had grown apart from her.

Christoffer learns from the solicitor that most of his father's assets have been committed to outstanding debts, but that he has inherited an unencumbered house. When he goes to inspect the substantial rural cottage, he meets the beautiful young housekeeper, Alena, who lives there with a daughter and works as a nightclub singer. They soon form a rapport, despite the fact that she speaks only Czech while he is limited to Danish and English. She is unable to answer his question about exactly what business his dad was in. Before long, he learns from the lawyer that his father ran "a dating bureau for older homosexuals".
As other secrets emerge, tensions build in the various characters and relationships, and are resolved in a poignant conclusion.

Cast
Mads Mikkelsen as Christoffer
Stine Stengade as Maja
Jana Plodková as Alena
Bořivoj Navrátil as the lawyer

External links

2006 films
Danish drama films
2006 drama films
Films shot in the Czech Republic
Films directed by Ole Christian Madsen
2000s Danish-language films